Cyd Zeigler Jr. is a commentator and author in the field of sexuality and sports. Zeigler co-founded Outsports and the National Gay Flag Football League. He had a featured part in the documentary F(l)ag Football (2015).

Early life and education
Zeigler was born in Harwich, Massachusetts, and lived there through high school. He was a track and field athlete and led his high school track team in scoring three consecutive years.  Zeigler graduated from Stanford University (B.A., Communication), where he founded Theta Delta Chi fraternity, was on the Stanford Men's Ultimate (Frisbee) Team, and was a contributor to the Stanford Review newspaper.

Career
He is a former sports editor for Genre Magazine, former associate editor for the New York Blade, and has written for Playboy, MSNBC, CNN, New York Press and Out Magazine. He has appeared on ESPN, Fox Sports Radio, CNN, and MSNBC as well as contributing to Sports Illustrated, Logo and The New York Times.

In 1999, Zeigler and Jim Buzinski founded Outsports. They co-authored The Outsports Revolution: Truth & Myth in the World of Gay Sports.

In 2002, Buzinski and Zeigler founded the National Gay Flag Football League.

Zeigler is credited with breaking the story of John Amaechi coming out of the closet in February 2007. Amaechi had contacted Zeigler months before, and Zeigler connected Amaechi with the publicist Howard Bragman, who had assisted other gay athletes in coming out. Zeigler has also broken national stories including the coming out of then-NFL prospect Michael Sam, the late gay brother of NFL Hall of Famer Michael Irvin, transgender Div. 1 NCAA athlete Kye Allums, openly gay football players Wade Davis and Alan Gendreau, and a racial headline by ESPN in reference to Jeremy Lin. Zeigler is featured in the 2015 documentary, F(l)ag Football.

He has been inducted into the LGBTQ Journalists Hall of Fame by the National Lesbian and Gay Journalists Association.

Personal life
Zeigler presently lives in Los Angeles with his husband, Dan Pinar, a dentist. He previously lived in New York City where he was a research editor for a global financial services firm. He was previously a development executive for Disney Channel, focusing on their movie and music franchises before leaving in 2001.

Works

Awards and nominations

References

External links
 Personal biography

1973 births
Gay sportsmen
American gay writers
American LGBT sportspeople
Living people
People from Harwich, Massachusetts
American sportsmen
Stanford University alumni
LGBT people from Massachusetts
20th-century American journalists
American male journalists
21st-century American journalists
American online publication editors
Sportswriters from Massachusetts
21st-century American LGBT people